Wootton Bassett Museum is a local museum in the market town of Royal Wootton Bassett, Wiltshire, England. It is located in the town hall which is a Grade II listed building.

History
The town hall was a gift to the town from Laurence Hyde, 1st Earl of Rochester, who had served as Member of Parliament for Wootton Basset, and was built in 1690. The design involved an open ground floor and an upper storey supported on 15 tapered oolite columns. The ground floor was the venue for local butter and cheese markets and the upper storey served as both a council chamber and a courthouse. Facilities on the ground floor included a "blind house" under the staircase where drunkards were held until they were completely sober and a storage facility for the hand-worked fire engine.

By the late 19th century, the building was in an extremely dilapidated state and under threat of demolition, before being extensively restored by the socialite, Lady Meux and her husband, in 1889. The restoration included the removal of both the "blind house" under the stairs and the storage facility for the hand-worked fire engine, thereby creating a completely open space on the ground floor.

The town hall was used as a meeting place by Cricklade and Wootton Bassett Rural District Council until 1972, when it fell vacant after the council converted the old primary school building in Station Road into a Civic Centre. Following an initiative by Dr Alan Stebbens, the then Chairman of Wootton Bassett Historical Society, the Wootton Bassett Museum was established in the empty town hall later that year. The museum subsequently built up a photographic collection covering life in Wootton Bassett during the 19th and 20th centuries as well as a ducking stool dating from 1686, geological items, stocks, and a whipping post. It also created a scale model of Wootton Bassett railway station as it would have looked before closure in 1965.

See also 
 List of museums in Wiltshire

Notes

References 

Historic house museums in Wiltshire
Local museums in Wiltshire
City and town halls in Wiltshire
Grade II listed buildings in Wiltshire
Royal Wootton Bassett
Government buildings completed in 1690